Stelis weddelliana is a species of orchid plant native to Bolivia.

References 

weddelliana
Flora of Bolivia